PTC Punjabi is a Punjabi television network from India. Indian politician and the president of the Shiromani Akali Dal Sukhbir Singh Badal holds a majority stake in PTC. It features general interest programming including news, dramas, comedies, music and talk shows. PTC Punjabi commenced operations on 6 August 2008 and in a year, became the most popular television network in Punjab.

In 2009, PTC Punjabi expanded its reach internationally. It launched in the United States on DirecTV on 23 August 2009. In September 2009, a Canadian version launched. In early 2010, PTC Punjabi was removed from DirecTV for unknown reasons. On 25 August 2010, PTC Punjabi launched on Dish Network, making the channel available in the United States once again. PTC hosts the annual PTC Punjabi Music Awards and PTC Punjabi Film Awards.

Channels

Sexual abuse allegations 
A contestant for the PTC Miss Punjaban pageant alleged that she had been kept in custody against her will and was pressured for sexual favors. PTC managing director Rabindra Narayan denied these allegations. The allegations led to calls for withdrawal of Gurbani telecast rights from PTC. The managing director of PTC network, Rabindra Narayan, was taken into custody on charges of sexual harassment, using criminal force on woman with intention of disrobing her, wrongful restraint, and confinement.

See also
 PTC News

References

External links

Mass media in Punjab, India
Punjabi-language television channels in India
Television networks in India
Television channels and stations established in 2008
Television broadcasting companies of India
Mass media companies of India
Television companies of India